Orange Springs is an unincorporated community in Marion County, Florida, United States. A small portion of the community extends into neighboring Putnam County. The community is part of the Ocala Metropolitan Statistical Area.

History
Orange Springs had its start in the late 1850s as a mineral spa.

Geography
Orange Springs is located at  (29.5058, -81.9456).

Climate

Points of interest
 James W. Townsend House
 Orange Springs Methodist Episcopal Church and Cemetery

Notable people
 John William Pearson

References

External links

 Ocala/Marion County Visitors & Convention Bureau

Unincorporated communities in Marion County, Florida
Unincorporated communities in Florida